Idol is a 2019 South Korean thriller film directed by Lee Su-jin, starring Han Suk-kyu, Sol Kyung-gu and Chun Woo-hee.

Cast
Han Suk-kyu as Goo Myung-hui
Sol Kyung-gu as Yoo Joong-sik 
Chun Woo-hee as Choi Ryeon-hwa
Yoo Seung-mok as Hwang-byun
Hyun Bong-sik as Detective Kim
Kang Mal-geum as Myung-hui's wife
Kim Seong-nyeo as Myung-hui's mother
Seo Joo-hee as Dong-sook
Kim Myung-gon as Member of national assembly Choi
Jo Byung-gyu as Yo-han
Lee Woo-hyun as Boo-nam
Kim Seo-won as Assistant Kim
Kim Jong-man as Kim Yong-goo
Kim Hee-jung as Red-light district female boss
Kim Jae-hwa as Soo-ryeon
Lee Yeong-seok as Stepfather
Seung Ooi-yeol as Kim Byun
Jeon Jin-ki as Member of national assembly Kim

Production 
Principal photography began on October 24, 2017, and wrapped on April 9, 2018.

References

External links

2019 films
2019 thriller films
South Korean thriller films
2010s South Korean films